Highway 101 is an east-west highway in Nova Scotia that runs from Bedford to Yarmouth.

The highway follows a  route along the southern coast of the Bay of Fundy through the Annapolis Valley, the largest agricultural district in the province.  Between its western terminus at Yarmouth to Weymouth, the highway is 2-lane controlled access.  Between Weymouth and Digby, the highway reverts to a 2-lane local road.  From Digby to Grand Pre, the highway is 2-lane controlled access.  From the Gaspereau River crossing near Grand Pre to 3 km west of Exit 6 (Falmouth) the highway is a 4-lane freeway. Heading east the highway is 2-lane controlled access until Exit 5 (Trunk 14). From Three Mile Plains to its eastern terminus at Bedford, the highway is a 4-lane freeway.  Some of the 2-lane controlled access sections of the highway are 3 or 4 lanes, with the addition of passing lanes.  One section of the 4-lane freeway near Hantsport is a short 5-lane (3 lanes westbound) section for about 2 km due to previous road configuration for a passing lane due to a steep hill. Similar to Highway 103, kilometre markers increase run west-to-east, increasing from Yarmouth to Bedford; however, exit numbers run east-to-west, increasing from Bedford to Yarmouth.

The provincial government named the highway the Harvest Highway on 7 December 2008 to recognize the important contributions of farmers in Nova Scotia.

History
The highway was developed in non-contiguous sections with the first parts, between Bedford, Windsor and Avonport,  built in the 1960s, followed by parts through the Annapolis Valley, Digby and Yarmouth counties in the 1970s–1990s.  The highway was built to provide a modern limited-access route between Halifax and Yarmouth, and the many towns and villages in the corridor.

Exit list

References

101
101
101
101
101
101
101
101
Middleton, Nova Scotia
Yarmouth, Nova Scotia